Cyrus Monk (born 7 November 1996) is an Australian cyclist, who currently rides for UCI ProTeam .

Personal life
Born in Warragul, Monk majored in Physiology (Bachelor of Science) at the University of Melbourne.

Major results

2015
 2nd Grafton to Inverell Classic
2016
 World University Cycling Championship
1st  Road race
3rd Criterium
 Oceania Cycling Championships
3rd Under-23 road race
7th Road race
2017
 Oceania Cycling Championships
3rd Under-23 time trial
5th Road race
 9th Grote Prijs Jean-Pierre Monseré
2018
 1st  Road race, National Under-23 Road Championships
 Oceania Cycling Championships
2nd Under-23 road race
3rd Road race
 10th Ronde van Vlaanderen Beloften
2019 
 3rd Gravel and Tar
2021
 4th Overall Belgrade Banjaluka
2022
 3rd Overall Tour of Sharjah
1st Stage 1 (ITT)

References

External links

1996 births
Living people
Australian male cyclists
Cyclists from Victoria (Australia)